The 1954 Milwaukee Braves season was the second in Milwaukee and the 84th overall season of the franchise.

Offseason 
 October 6, 1953: Art Fowler was acquired from the Braves by the Cincinnati Redlegs as part of a conditional deal.
 December 7, 1953: Catfish Metkovich was purchased by the Braves from the Chicago Cubs.

Regular season 
 July 31, 1954: Joe Adcock hit four home runs in one game. The four home runs were hit off four different Brooklyn Dodgers pitchers, becoming the seventh player in major league history to hit four home runs in one game. Additionally, Adcock hit a double, setting a major league record of 18 total bases.
 August 1, 1954: Eddie Mathews hit the 100th home run of his career.

Season standings

Record vs. opponents

Notable transactions 
 June 1954: Lee Maye was signed as an amateur free agent by the Braves.
 June 14, 1954: Sibby Sisti was released by the Braves.

Roster

Player stats

Batting

Starters by position 
Note: Pos = Position; G = Games played; AB = At bats; H = Hits; Avg. = Batting average; HR = Home runs; RBI = Runs batted in

Other batters 
Note: G = Games played; AB = At bats; H = Hits; Avg. = Batting average; HR = Home runs; RBI = Runs batted in

Pitching

Starting pitchers 
Note: G = Games pitched; IP = Innings pitched; W = Wins; L = Losses; ERA = Earned run average; SO = Strikeouts

Other pitchers 
Note: G = Games pitched; IP = Innings pitched; W = Wins; L = Losses; ERA = Earned run average; SO = Strikeouts

Relief pitchers 
Note: G = Games pitched; W = Wins; L = Losses; SV = Saves; ERA = Earned run average; SO = Strikeouts

Farm system 

LEAGUE CHAMPIONS: Atlanta, Quebec, LawtonMiami Beach franchise transferred to Miami, May 20, 1954; Florida International League folded, July 27

Notes

References 

1954 Milwaukee Braves season at Baseball Reference

Milwaukee Braves seasons
Milwaukee Braves season
Milwau